Anne Keothavong was the defending champion, but lost to Anastasia Rodionova in the first round.

Annika Beck won the title, defeating Eva Birnerová in the final, 6–3, 7–6(10–8).

Barbora Záhlavová-Strýcová's results at the 2012 Büschl Open were annulled in February 2013 after the player had committed an anti-doping rule violation on a sample given on 16 October 2012 at the Luxembourg Open containing sibutramine.

Seeds

Main draw

Finals

Top half

Bottom half

References

External links 
 Main draw

Buschl Open - Singles
Ismaning Open